Joe Byrne (born December 26, 1961) served as leader of the New Democratic Party of Prince Edward Island from 2018 to 2020. He became leader on April 7, 2018, after defeating two other candidates on the first ballot of the NDP leadership convention.

Previously, Byrne was the federal NDP candidate in Charlottetown riding in the 2011, 2015 and 2019 federal elections, placing second behind Liberal candidate Sean Casey in 2015, and fourth in 2019.

Byrne was a missionary in the Dominican Republic for seven years and then served as director of youth ministry at the Roman Catholic Diocese of Charlottetown for 12 years. Since 2010, he has been community connections supervisor with the PEI Association of Newcomers to Canada, where he has helped plan the annual ‘DiverseCity’ festival.

Byrne also contested the 2019 Prince Edward Island general election in District 12, Charlottetown-Victoria Park, losing to Green Party candidate Karla Bernard. Byrne resigned as PEI NDP leader effective September 1, 2020.

Electoral record

References

1961 births
Living people
Anglophone Quebec people
New Democratic Party of Prince Edward Island leaders
People from Sept-Îles, Quebec
University of Prince Edward Island alumni